Lasis or LASIS may refer to:

Lasi people, an ethnic group of Pakistan
LASIS, or Laser ablation synthesis in solution, a method in nanotechnology
Normunds Lasis (born 1985), Latvian cyclist

See also 
 Lasi (disambiguation)
 Lassi (disambiguation)